"Start Me Up" is a song by the English rock band The Rolling Stones from their 1981 album Tattoo You.

"Start Me Up" may also refer to:
"Start Me Up" (Salt-n-Pepa song), a song by Salt-n-Pepa
"Start Me Up" (Grey's Anatomy), episode of Grey's Anatomy
"Start Me Up" (Instant Star episode), episode of Instant Star
Start Me Up (Family Guy), an episode of season 18 of Family Guy